"Kosovo" is a parody of the Beach Boys hit song "Kokomo".  It was produced in 1999 by Seattle radio comedian/radio personality Bob Rivers. Several years later, in 2005, the song gained notoriety after Norwegian soldiers filmed a music video while serving as peacekeepers in Kosovo.

Satirical lyrics
According to Rivers, "...the intent of the song was to mock my own country for its bullying ways around the world. The idea was to point out how casually the U.S. plays World Police. The song takes on the persona of the U.S. government, ridiculing the fact that we push others around without much concern."
We'll kick some ass,
and then we'll see how it goes,
and then we really don't know.
Good luck to Kosovo.

Music video
In May, 2005, a group of Norwegian peacekeepers in Kosovo (calling themselves the "Shiptare Boys") parodied the music video for "Kokomo," using Rivers' song with their own hand-held video camera footage. In the parody, the soldiers imitate dance moves and scenes from the original music video in desolate war-torn areas around Kosovo. It was widely broadcast in the Balkans, prompting the Norwegian ambassador to formally apologize.

Nicholas Wood of The New York Times wrote,

Rivers stated about the music video, "The song has been stolen...and I wish there were a way to stop it." in 2009, the group Wartist (named for a Group connecting War and the Arts) summarized the affair, writing: 

The last few seconds of the hand-made video show one of the soldiers being hit by a car, but that has been edited out of many of the video postings. Also, when subtitles were put on the song in Serbia, they mistakenly replaced "Milošević" with the name of a 14th-century Serb hero,  Miloš Obilić. The soldiers, the "Shiptare Boys," also known as the "Shqiptare [Albanian] Boys," had all left the Norwegian Army by the time the investigation took place, so no further action was taken.

References

External links 
 The music video

Musical parodies
Protest songs
Songs about Serbia
1999 songs